Sannidal Church is a parish church of the Church of Norway in Kragerø Municipality in Vestfold og Telemark county, Norway. It is located in the village of Sannidal. It is the church for the Sannidal parish which is part of the Bamble prosti (deanery) in the Diocese of Agder og Telemark. The white, wooden church was built in a cruciform design in 1772 using plans drawn up by an unknown architect. The church seats about 330 people.

History
The earliest existing historical records of the church date back to the year 1398, but the church was not built that year. The first church in Sannidal was a wooden stave church that was built around the year 1200. The church is said to have had a tower on the roof as well as open-air corridors surrounding the building. In 1723, the church was sold into private ownership during the Norwegian church sale when the King sold the churches to pay off debts from the Great Northern War. A priest named Alstrup bought the church (and several other churches in the region). In 1738, the church was sold to a group of 20 local farmers. The maintenance had been neglected for a long time, and eventually it was not possible to find the money to repair the old stave church.

In 1766, Jakob Matssøn Lund was appointed parish priest in Sannidal and he became a big proponent of building a new church. In 1770, the old church was torn down and work on a new church began, although formal permission was not given until May 1772. It was a wooden, cruciform building with the chancel in the eastern transept. Some of the materials from the old church were reused in the construction of the new church, mostly in the floor and ceiling of the building. The church was completed on 1 September 1772. In 1774, the owners of the church gifted its ownership to all the villagers, who agreed to maintain it. In 1803, a tower was built. In 1814, a sacristy was built.

In 1814, this church served as an election church. Together with more than 300 other parish churches across Norway, it was a polling station for elections to the 1814 Norwegian Constituent Assembly which wrote the Constitution of Norway. This was Norway's first national elections. Each church parish was a constituency that elected people called "electors" who later met together in each county to elect the representatives for the assembly that was to meet in Eidsvoll later that year.

The church was renovated in 1883. In the period after 1910, there was talk of moving the church to a more central location in the parish, but this was rejected. The church renovated again in 1943 when the windows were returned to their original, slightly smaller size. The building was also renovated in 1951 and in 1972. During work on the interior ceiling in the winter of 2009–2010, old painted ceiling decorations were uncovered, but it was decided to paint over them.

See also
List of churches in Agder og Telemark

References

Kragerø
Churches in Vestfold og Telemark
Cruciform churches in Norway
Wooden churches in Norway
18th-century Church of Norway church buildings
Churches completed in 1772
13th-century establishments in Norway
Norwegian election church